The following is a list of notable events and releases of the year 2018 in Norwegian music.

Events

January
 11 –  The 17th All Ears festival started in Oslo (January 11–14).
 19 –  The 37th annual Djangofestival started on Cosmopolite in Oslo (January 19–20).
 25 –  The 31st Nordlysfestivalen started in Tromsø (January 25 – February 4).
 30 –  The Barokkfest started in Trondheim (January 30 – February 4).
 31
 The 7th Bodø Jazz Open started in Bodø (January 31 – February 3).
 The 13th Ice Music Festival started in Geilo (January 31 – February 4).

February 
 1 – The 20th Polarjazz Festival started in Longyearbyen, Svalbard (February 1–4).
 3 – The Oslo Operaball was arranged in Oslo (February 3–4).
 21 – The Hemsingfestivalen started in Aurdal (February 21–25).
 23 – Kirsti Huke received the 2017 Radka Toneff Memorial Award.
 25 – The 2017 Spellemannprisen awards proceeded with Mari Boine as the 2017 honorary award recipient.

March 
 1 – The By:Larm Festival started in Oslo (March 1–3).
 7 – The Borealis Festival started in Bergen (March 7–11).
 9 – The 61st Narvik Winter Festival started in Narvik (March 9–18).
 10 – Alexander Rybak won Melodi Grand Prix and is the Norwegian representative in the international final.
 23 – The 45th Vossajazz started in Voss (March 23–25).
 29 – The Inferno Metal Festival started in Oslo (March 29 – April 1).

April 
 18 –  The Nidaros Bluesfestival started in Trondheim (April 18–23).

May 
 4
 The Balejazz started in Balestrand (May 4–6).
 The 29th MaiJazz started in Stavanger (May 4–9).
 9 – AnJazz the Hamar Jazz Festival started at Hamar (May 9–13).
 16 – Hardanger Musikkfest started at Hardanger (May 16–21).
 23 – The Festspillene i Bergen started in Bergen (May 23 – June 6).
 25 – The 46th Nattjazz started in Bergen (May 26 – June 4).

June
 2 – The National Music Day was arranged in Oslo.
 8 – The Kråkeslottfestivalen started at Senja (June 8–10).
 12
 The Bergenfest started in Bergen (June 12–16).
 The Norwegian Wood music festival started in Oslo (June 12–16).
 26 – The Risør kammermusikkfest started in Risør (June 26 – July 1).

July 
 4 – The Kongsberg Jazzfestival opened at Kongsberg consert (August 4–7).
 7 – The 22nd Skånevik Bluesfestival started in Skånevik, Norway, with Jeff Beck as headliner (July 7 – 9).
 12 – The 17th Stavernfestivalen started in Stavern (August 12–14).
 16 – The Moldejazz starts in Molde (August 16–21).
 19 – The Slottsfjell Festival started in Tønsberg (July 19–21).
 25 – The 23rd Canal Street Festival started in Arendal (July 25–28).

August 
 7 – The 20th Øyafestivalen started in Oslo (August 7–11).
 8 – The 32nd Sildajazz starts in Haugesund (August 8–12).
 9 – The Tromsø Jazz Festival started in Tromsø (August 9 – 12).
 12 – The 33rd Oslo Jazzfestival starts in Oslo (August 12–18).
 17 – The Parkenfestivalen starts in Bodø (August 17–18).
 30
 The 14th Punktfestivalen opens in Kristiansand (August 30 - September 1|).
 The Blues in Hell starts in Stjørdal (August 30 – September 3).
 Nathalie Stutzmann is appointed as new chief conductor for Kristiansand Symphony Orchestra. The French conductor is engaged for three years, and succeeds Giordano Bellincampi.

September 
 The Granittrock Festival starts in Grorud.

October 
 18 – The 35th DølaJazz starts in Lillehammer (October 18 – 21).
 27 – The Osafestivalen starts in Voss (October 26 – 28).
 30 – The Oslo World Music Festival started in Oslo (October 30 – November 4).

November 
 14 – The Vardø Blues Festival (Blues i Vintermørket) starts (November 14 – 18).

December 
 11 – The Nobel Peace Prize Concert is held at Telenor Arena.

Albums released

January

February

March

April

May

June

July

August

New Artists 
 Birgitta Elisa Oftestad, classical cellist and winner of the NRK talent award Virtuos.

Deaths 

 January
 29 – Asmund Bjørken, jazz and traditional folk accordionist and saxophonist (born 1933).
 30 – Bjørn Boysen, organist (born 1943).

 February
 4 – Leif Rygg, traditional folk Hardanger fiddler (born 1940).
 5 – Ove Stokstad, graphic artist, jazz clarinetist and saxophonist (born 1939).
 16 – Tor Brevik, composer (born 1932).

 March
 9 – Ole H. Bremnes, folk singer and poet (born 1930).
 18 – Håkon Banken, singer (born 1949)
 31 – Frode Viken, guitarist and songwriter, D.D.E. (born 1955).

 April

 May
 11 – Mikhail Alperin, Ukrainian born jazz pianist, member of the Moscow Art Trio, professor at the Norwegian Academy of Music (born 1956).

 June

 July
 5 – Bjørn Lie-Hansen, opera singer (born 1937).
 25 – Roald Stensby, rock singer (born 1940).

See also 
 2018 in Norway
 Music of Norway
 Norway in the Eurovision Song Contest 2018
 Spellemannprisen
 Buddyprisen
 Nordlysprisen
 Edvard Grieg Memorial Award
 Thorgeir Stubø Memorial Award
 Rolf Gammleng Memorial Award
 Radka Toneff Memorial Award

References

 
Norwegian music
Norwegian
Music
2010s in Norwegian music